The Colombia men's national squash team represents the Colombia in international squash team competitions, and is governed by Colombian Squash Federation.

Current team
 Miguel Ángel Rodríguez
 Andrés Herrera
 Erick Daniel Herrera
 Bernardo Samper
 Edgar Ramirez

Results

World Team Squash Championships

See also 
 Colombian Squash Federation
 World Team Squash Championships

References 

Squash teams
Men's national squash teams
Squash
Men's sport in Colombia